Cotulla is a city in and the county seat of La Salle County, Texas, United States. Its population was 3,718 as of the 2020 census.

History

Immigrant Joseph Cotulla, who was reared in Silesia, then a part of Prussia, migrated to the United States in the 1850s. He joined the Union Army in Brownsville, Texas. He lived in Atascosa County, but arrived in La Salle County in 1868 to establish what became a large ranching operation. After learning that the International-Great Northern Railroad intended to lay tracks in La Salle County, he worked to establish the town that bears his name.

In 1881, Cotulla donated 120 acres of his land to the railroad, and in 1882, a depot was constructed there. In 1883, the town was granted a post office. The same year, Cotulla became the county seat by special election.

Joseph Cotulla's great-grandson, William Lawrence Cotulla (born around 1936), a former storekeeper in Cotulla, is a rancher in La Salle, Dimmit, and Webb Counties. In a 2013 interview with the Laredo Morning Times, William Cotulla noted the community of his birth has changed completely in less than 80 years, having gone through several phases, beginning with emphasis on farming, then ranching, thereafter hunting leases, and now petroleum and natural gas through the Eagle Ford Shale boom. With declining gasoline prices, though, the Eagle Ford boom took a sharp downturn by the fall of 2015.

On June 28, 2013, the Texas Historical Commission, the United States Department of the Interior, and the National Register of Historic Places designated downtown Cotulla as a significant part of Texas history with the unveiling of an historic marker. In 2006, Cotulla had been designated as a Texas Main Street community.

City manager Lazaro "Larry" Dovalina (born 1947), who formerly held the same position in Laredo, compared the impact of the recent growth of Cotulla to the arrival of the railroad in the late 19th century.  Cotulla is believed to have tripled in population since the 2010 census, with possibly 12,000 residents in 2013. With Eagle Ford Shale and many jobs in the oil and gas fields, Cotulla has seen the building of new hotels, restaurants, truck stops, and refineries. Many older buildings downtown are being updated and renovated for other uses. Dovalina reported that the ad valorem property tax base in Cotulla has increased from $52 million in 2009 to $127 million in 2013. The growth has made affordable housing a premium in the community.

In 1973, two railroad locomotives collided in Cotulla, and three people were killed as a result. In 2008, the area around Cotulla burned in a huge grass fire.

With continuing growth from the Eagle Ford Shale deposit, Cotulla houses the largest sand fracking facility in North America. Cotulla falls within the second-largest oil-producing region of the United States. The oil boom has increased sales tax collections in Cotulla from $445,000 in 2009 to more than $3 million in 2013. The city has 16 hotels and seven others under construction. The hotel-motel tax of 7% is less than that in larger surrounding cities. Cotulla is seeking to attract Walmart, H-E-B, and other companies once it can show that its growth is sustainable.

Geography

Cotulla is located at  (28.434144, –99.236343). This is 81 mi (147 km) southwest of San Antonio.

The Nueces River flows through southern Cotulla in a southeastward direction to the Gulf of Mexico near Corpus Christi.

Demographics

2020 census

As of the 2020 United States census, there were 3,718 people, 1,485 households, and 1,110 families residing in the city.

2000 census
As of the census of 2000, 3,614 people, 1,208 households, and 901 families were residing in the city. The population density was 1,831.8 people per mi2 (708.3/km2). The 1,504 housing units averaged 762.3 per mi2 (294.8/km2). The racial makeup of the city was 83.45% White, 0.64% African American, 0.39% Native American, 0.50% Asian, 12.67% from other races, and 2.35% from two or more races. Hispanics or Latinos of any race were 83.56% of the population.

Of the 1,208 households, 39.0% had children under the age of 18 living with them, 52.7% were married couples living together, 17.8% had a female householder with no husband present, and 25.4% were not families. About 22.6% of all households were made up of individuals, and 11.8% had someone living alone who was 65 years of age or older. The average household size was 2.95, and the average family size was 3.50.

In the city, the age distribution was 33.6% under 18, 8.6% from 18 to 24, 24.0% from 25 to 44, 21.3% from 45 to 64, and 12.5% who were 65 or older. The median age was 32 years. For every 100 females, there were 90.2 males. For every 100 females age 18 and over, there were 87.2 males.

The median income for a household in the city was $23,250, and for a family was $25,951. Males had a median income of $21,199 versus $17,415 for females. The per capita income for the city was $10,856. About 27.9% of families and 30.1% of the population were below the poverty line, including 39.0% of those under age 18 and 28.1% of those age 65 or over.

Law and government
The La Salle County Courthouse in downtown Cotulla has undergone extensive renovation.

Education

 Cotulla is within the Cotulla Independent School District. Cotulla High School, with grades 9–12, is located east of town. The modern structure is divided into several noncontiguous units.

Religion
Cotulla has Roman Catholic, Southern Baptist, United Methodist, Presbyterian, and nondenominational churches. The Presbyterians and Baptists originally shared the Methodist facilities, which began in 1881. New Methodist buildings were constructed in 1906 and again in 1928.

In 1883–1884, Reverend W. D. Johnson organized a Baptist fellowship in Cotulla. After several years of meeting at the Methodist Church, the first Baptist building opened in 1889, with minister John Van Epps Covey (1821–1898) preaching the first sermon in the new structure. The current church sanctuary on Main Street opened in 1948 under the leadership of Reverend Jesse Cooke. The new First Baptist pastor in Cotulla as of 2013 is Loren G. Fast.

Prevailing Word Church, located in a new sanctuary at 419 South Main, had co-pastors in 2009, L. Lynn Beams and Abram de la Garza. It has services at 3 pm Sundays, rather than the customary morning hours, and midweek services on Thursday evenings, instead of Wednesday.

Notable people

 Jeff Bezos, founder and CEO of Amazon.com, was the wealthiest person in the world, as of December 2017. His maternal ancestors were settlers who lived in Texas. Over the generations, the family acquired a  ranch in Cotulla
 John Lewis Gaddis, known as the "Dean of Cold War Historians", was born in Cotulla in 1941
 O. Henry, the short story writer, lived on a sheep ranch near Cotulla in the early 1880s with the successful goal of improving his health in the dry climate
 Lyndon B. Johnson, U.S. President; taught public school in Cotulla from 1928 to 1929
 Hailey Kinsel, three-time world champion barrel racer, was born and raised on her parents' cattle ranch near Cotulla 
 Phil Lyne, a former rodeo cowboy and 1979 ProRodeo Hall of Fame inductee, resides in Cotulla
 J.B. Mauney, an American professional rodeo cowboy who specializes in bull riding, and competes in the Professional Bull Riders (PBR) and Professional Rodeo Cowboys Association (PRCA) circuits, he is a two time PBR World Champion in 2013 and 2015. He resides in Cotulla.
 George Strait, the King of Country Music, has a ranch near Cotulla
 Kevin Patrick Yeary, judge of the Texas Court of Criminal Appeals, was born in Cotulla and raised in Laredo

References

External links

 Handbook of Texas Online article
 Cotulla Airport (Page Aviation)

Cities in Texas
Cities in La Salle County, Texas
County seats in Texas
Populated places established in 1882
1882 establishments in Texas
Nueces River